The FAA Reauthorization Act of 2018 is a United States federal law, enacted during the 115th United States Congress, which reauthorizes the Federal Aviation Administration (FAA) and other programs till the end of fiscal year 2023. The bill was passed by Congress on October 3, 2018, and was signed by President Donald Trump on October 5, 2018.

The law contains a provision that requires the FAA to set a standard for the minimum size of airline seats. The law also bans the use of electronic cigarettes on aircraft.

Provisions and Short Titles 
 Better Utilization of Investments Leading to Development Act of 2018 (BUILD Act of 2018)
 Commercial Balloon Pilot Safety Act of 2018
 Concrete Masonry Products Research, Education, and Promotion Act of 2018
 Disaster Recovery Reform Act of 2018
 FAA Leadership in Groundbreaking High-Tech Research and Development Act (FLIGHT R&D Act)
 FAA Reauthorization Act of 2018
 Fairness for Pilots Act
 Geospatial Data Act of 2018
 Maritime Security Improvement Act of 2018
 National Transportation Safety Board Reauthorization Act
 Preventing Emerging Threats Act of 2018
 Saracini Aviation Safety Act of 2018
 Securing General Aviation and Charter Air Carrier Service Act
 Sports Medicine Licensure Clarity Act of 2018
 Transparency Improvements and Compensation to Keep Every Ticketholder Safe Act of 2018 (TICKETS Act)
 TSA Modernization Act

References

External links 
 FAA Reauthorization Act of 2018 (PDF/details) as amended in the GPO Statute Compilations collection
 FAA Reauthorization Act of 2018 (PDF/details) as enacted in the US Statutes at Large

Acts of the 115th United States Congress
Federal Aviation Administration